Interstate 95 (I-95) is the main north–south Interstate Highway on the East Coast of the United States, running from U.S. Route 1 (US 1) in Miami, Florida, north to the Houlton–Woodstock Border Crossing between Maine and the Canadian province of New Brunswick. The highway largely parallels the Atlantic coast and US 1, except for the portion between Savannah, Georgia, and Washington, D.C., and the portion between Portland and Houlton in Maine, both of which follow a more direct inland route.

I-95 serves as the principal road link between the major cities of the Eastern Seaboard. Major metropolitan areas along its route include Miami, Jacksonville, Savannah, Florence, Fayetteville, and Richmond in the Southeast; Washington, Baltimore, Wilmington and Philadelphia, Newark, and New York City in the Mid-Atlantic; and New Haven, Providence, Boston, Portsmouth, and Portland in New England. The Charleston, Wilmington, and Norfolk–Virginia Beach metropolitan areas, the three major coastal metros bypassed by the highway's inland portion, are connected to I-95 by I-26, I-40, and I-64, respectively.

I-95 is one of the oldest routes of the Interstate Highway System. Many sections of I-95 incorporated preexisting sections of toll roads where they served the same right-of-way. Until 2018, there was a gap in I-95's original routing in Central New Jersey caused by the cancelation of the Somerset Freeway. An interchange between the Pennsylvania Turnpike and I-95 was completed in September 2018; this allowed I-95 to be rerouted along the Pearl Harbor Memorial Turnpike Extension of the New Jersey Turnpike into Pennsylvania, creating a continuous Interstate route from Maine to Florida for the first time.

I-95 passes through 15 states (as well as a brief stretch in the District of Columbia while crossing the Potomac River), more than any other Interstate. According to the US Census Bureau, only five of the 96 counties or county equivalents along its route are completely rural, while statistics provided by the I-95 Corridor Coalition suggest that the region served is "over three times more densely populated than the U.S. average and as densely settled as much of Western Europe". According to the Corridor Coalition, I-95 serves 110 million people and facilitates 40 percent of the country's gross domestic product.

Route description

|-
|FL
|
|-
|GA
|
|-
|SC
|
|-
|NC
|
|-
|VA
|
|-
|DC
|
|-
|MD
|
|-
|DE
|
|-
|PA
|
|-
|NJ
|
|-
|NY
|
|-
|CT
|
|-
|RI
|
|-
|MA
|
|-
|NH
|
|-
|ME
|
|-
|Total
|
|}

South

Florida

I-95 begins at US 1 just south of downtown Miami and travels along the state's east coast, passing through Fort Lauderdale, West Palm Beach, the Gold Coast, the Treasure Coast, the Space Coast, Daytona Beach, Port Orange, St. Augustine, and Jacksonville before entering the US state of Georgia near the city of Brunswick, Georgia. This portion of the highway was notably featured in the film Flight of the Navigator when the spaceship flew along the highway toward Miami. In Miami and Fort Lauderdale, SunPass express lanes pass over the highway.

Prior to 1987, a notable gap in the highway existed between West Palm Beach and Fort Pierce; I-95 traffic between those cities was diverted to Florida's Turnpike. Today, I-95 runs along a routing parallel to the turnpike.

In 2010, more fatalities occurred along the Florida section of I-95 than on any other Interstate Highway in the country.

Georgia

In Georgia, I-95 closely parallels the coastline, traveling primarily through marshlands a few miles from the shore. The route bypasses the cores of major coastal cities Brunswick and Savannah, routing traffic through the western sides of both cities' metro areas; it connects to the latter city by an intersection with I-16 before crossing into South Carolina. The exit numbers were converted from a sequential system to a mileage-based system around 2000. I-95 in Georgia has the unsigned designation of State Route 405 (SR 405).

South Carolina 

Entering South Carolina, I-95 diverts from its coastal route to a more inland route to the west. I-95 does not go near any major cities in South Carolina, with the largest city along its route being Florence, the tenth largest in the state. The rest of South Carolina can be accessed via other Interstates that intersect I-95. It intersects I-26 near Harleyville, which provides access to Charleston, Columbia, and Upstate South Carolina. It also intersects I-20 at Florence, which also connects to Columbia and then on to Atlanta, Georgia. At the North Carolina border, I-95 passes the South of the Border roadside attraction.

North Carolina 

In North Carolina, I-95 informally serves as the separation between the state's western Piedmont and eastern Atlantic Plain regions. Much like its route in South Carolina, I-95 runs through mostly rural areas, avoiding major cities like Raleigh and Durham. The route intersects I-74 near Lumberton, I-40 near Benson, and Future I-87/US 64 near Rocky Mount. Several medium sized cities lie along I-95 in North Carolina, including (from south to north) Fayetteville, Wilson, and Rocky Mount. At Gaston, I-95 crosses into Virginia.

Mid-Atlantic region

Much of I-95 in the Mid-Atlantic region is tolled, following the course of several turnpikes that predate the Interstate Highway System, as well as several other toll roads and toll bridges.

Virginia 

I-95 enters the Mid-Atlantic region in Virginia and travels through the center of the densest and most populous urban region in the US. I-95 travels north–south through Virginia, passing through Petersburg, and follows the Richmond–Petersburg Turnpike into downtown Richmond (where it is concurrent briefly with I-64), and, from there, it turns northeast as it enters Northern Virginia. In the Washington metropolitan area, it is concurrent with the Capital Beltway from the Springfield Interchange along with I-495, before passing through the southernmost corner of the District of Columbia for about  along the Woodrow Wilson Bridge before entering Maryland near National Harbor, Maryland.

Maryland 

In Maryland, I-95 goes northeast toward Baltimore, paralleling the older Baltimore–Washington Parkway. I-95 uses the Fort McHenry Tunnel to travel under Baltimore's Inner Harbor and travels through northeast Maryland along the John F. Kennedy Memorial Highway, crossing into Delaware near Elkton.

Delaware 

Entering Delaware at Newark, I-95 follows the Delaware Turnpike east across Delaware until the large and complex I-495/I-295/US 202/Delaware Route 141 interchange near Newport and turns northeast through Wilmington, skirting the west side of the downtown area before leaving Delaware in Claymont at the state's extreme northeastern corner.

Pennsylvania 

Entering southeastern Pennsylvania near Marcus Hook, I-95 crosses Delaware County and the city of Chester, closely following the Delaware River.  Entering Philadelphia near Philadelphia International Airport, the freeway has an interchange with I-76 before it follows a large viaduct along the extreme eastern edge of Center City Philadelphia. Northeast of Philadelphia in Bucks County, I-95 joins the Pennsylvania Turnpike near Bristol before entering New Jersey on the Delaware River–Turnpike Toll Bridge.

New Jersey 

In New Jersey, I-95 follows the Pearl Harbor Memorial Turnpike Extension of the New Jersey Turnpike, crossing the Delaware River on the Delaware River–Turnpike Toll Bridge, joining the mainline turnpike at exit 6. I-95 has interchanges with I-78 in Newark and I-80 in southern Teaneck. At the end of the turnpike in Fort Lee, I-95 turns east along its own freeway alignment and connects to New York City (and crosses into New York state) over the Hudson River via the George Washington Bridge.

New York 

I-95 in New York City comprises all or part several named expressways, including the Trans-Manhattan, Cross Bronx, and Bruckner expressways, as it crosses east-northeast across the boroughs of Manhattan and the Bronx. Within this  stretch, I-95 intersects I-87 in the South Bronx, which connects to Albany and Upstate New York, as well as several auxiliary Interstates that provide access to other New York City boroughs and to Long Island. Entering Westchester County in Pelham, I-95 then follows the New England Thruway northeast to the Connecticut border at Port Chester, where it continues as the Connecticut Turnpike.

New England

Connecticut

I-95 enters New England in the state of Connecticut, where it closely follows state's southern coast. The highway's direction through Connecticut is primarily east–west, and it passes through the most densely populated part of the state, including the cities of Stamford, Bridgeport (the state's most populous city), and New Haven. In New Haven, it intersects with I-91 as it passes into the more rural areas of the Lower Connecticut River Valley. I-95 leaves the Connecticut Turnpike at I-395 at the East Lyme–Waterford town line. I-95 next passes New London and Groton, before the route curves northeast and leaving its close connection to the coast. It leaves Connecticut in the town of North Stonington.

Rhode Island 

I-95 enters Rhode Island in the town of Hopkinton and connects the rural areas of the southwestern corner of the state with the more metropolitan region around the state capital, Providence, in the state's northeastern corner. It leaves Rhode Island in the city of Pawtucket.

Massachusetts 

Entering Massachusetts in Attleboro, I-95 heads northeast toward Boston. At this point, I-93 has its southern terminus and provides access to the city of Boston itself. I-95 intersects the Massachusetts Turnpike/I-90 at the Weston–Newton line and I-93 a second time at the tripoint of Woburn, Reading, and Stoneham. North of Boston, I-95 leaves the beltway and heads northward in Peabody, while Route 128 continues east to Cape Ann. I-95 leaves Massachusetts in Salisbury.

New Hampshire 

I-95 enters New Hampshire in the town of Seabrook, following the pre-Interstate New Hampshire Turnpike and traversing the  Seacoast Region and the historic city of Portsmouth where it leaves the state.

Maine 

In Maine, it follows the Maine Turnpike, closely following the coast in a northeasterly direction until reaching Portland, the state's largest city. From there, it turns northward to Augusta, where the Maine Turnpike ends while I-95 continues north to Palmyra, where it turns east to Bangor. From Bangor, it turns north again to Smyrna and makes a final turn to the east, reaching the Houlton–Woodstock Border Crossing in Houlton. The road continues into the Canadian province of New Brunswick as Route 95.

History
Many parts of I-95 were made up of toll roads that had already been constructed or planned, particularly in the northeast. Many of these routes still exist today, but some have removed their tolls. All current I-95 toll facilities are compatible with the E-ZPass electronic payment system; in Florida, while I-95 can be driven toll-free, use of the "95 Express Managed Toll Lanes" requires a SunPass transponder (E-ZPass is now compatible with SunPass).

The toll roads utilized as part of I-95 formerly included Florida's Turnpike, the Richmond–Petersburg Turnpike (tolled until 1992), and the Connecticut Turnpike (tolled until 1985). Additionally, the Fuller Warren Bridge, spanning the St. Johns River in Jacksonville, Florida, was tolled until the 1980s. Today, tolls remain on Maryland's Fort McHenry Tunnel and John F. Kennedy Memorial Highway, the Delaware Turnpike, the Pennsylvania Turnpike, the New Jersey Turnpike, New York's George Washington Bridge and New England Thruway, the New Hampshire Turnpike, and the Maine Turnpike.

By 1968, three states had completed their sections of I-95: Connecticut, using its existing turnpikes; New York; and Delaware.

21st century

Until 2018, a gap existed on I-95 within New Jersey. From Pennsylvania, I-95 entered the state on the Scudder Falls Bridge and continued east to US 1 in Lawrence Township. Here, I-95 abruptly ended and transitioned into I-295. From New York, I-95 entered the state on the George Washington Bridge and followed the New Jersey Turnpike south to exit 6, ran along an extension of the turnpike, and ended on the Delaware River–Turnpike Toll Bridge at the Pennsylvania state line, where the route transitioned into I-276. This discontinuity was caused by the 1983 cancelation of the Somerset Freeway, a planned alignment of I-95 further inland from the turnpike. In order to close the gap, an interchange was constructed where I-95 crosses the Pennsylvania Turnpike in Bristol Township, Pennsylvania. After the first components of the interchange opened on September 22, 2018, I-95 was rerouted onto the Pennsylvania Turnpike, meeting up with where I-95 previously ended at the state line. This project closed the last remaining gap in the route. The former section of I-95 between the Pennsylvania Turnpike and US 1 in Lawrence became an extension of I-295. The interchange with the Pennsylvania Turnpike will be expanded in the future, connecting northbound I-95 with the westbound turnpike and the eastbound turnpike with southbound I-95.

In the 21st century, several large projects between Richmond, Virginia, and New Jersey have aimed to decrease congestion along the corridor. The reconstruction of the Springfield Interchange in Northern Virginia, just outside Washington DC helped to ease traffic at the intersection of I-95, I-495, and I-395, and surrounding interchanges. The Springfield Interchange is one of the busiest highway junctions on the East Coast, serving between 400,000 and 500,000 vehicles per day. With the exception of high-occupancy toll (HOT) lanes on the Capital Beltway (I-495/I-95), this project was completed in July 2007. A few miles to the east was another major project: the Woodrow Wilson Bridge replacement. The bridge carries I-95/I-495 over the Potomac River. The former Woodrow Wilson Bridge, which has since been demolished, was a six-lane bridge that was severely overcapacity. The new bridge is actually two bridges with a total of 12 lanes; five in each direction, with an additional lane in each direction for future use (rapid-bus or train). This project was completed with the 10 lanes opened on December 13, 2008, greatly reducing the traffic delays on the beltway. The lanes are divided into two through lanes and three local lanes in each direction.

In 2006, the Virginia General Assembly passed SJ184, a resolution calling for an interstate compact to build a toll highway between Dover, Delaware, and Charleston, South Carolina, as an alternative to I-95 that would allow long-distance traffic to avoid the Washington metropolitan area.

Federal legislation has identified I-95 through Connecticut as High Priority Corridor 65. A long-term multibillion-dollar program to upgrade the entire length of I-95 through Connecticut has been underway since the mid-1990s and is expected to continue through at least 2020. Several miles of the Connecticut Turnpike through Bridgeport were widened and brought up to Interstate standards. Work has shifted to reconstructing and widening  of I-95 through New Haven, which includes replacing the Pearl Harbor Memorial Bridge. Environmental studies for reconstructing and widening  of I-95 from New Haven to the Rhode Island state line are also progressing.

There are plans to expand the  I-95 corridor from Petersburg, Virginia, to Florida through a US multistate agreement to study how to improve the corridor through widening and reconstruction, with the goal of reducing congestion and improving overall safety for years to come.

I-95 from the South Carolina–Georgia line to the freeway's southern terminus in South Florida has been widened to a minimum of six lanes. The section from Jacksonville to the I-4 junction in Daytona Beach was expanded to six lanes in 2005. Projects begun in 2009, widening the roadbed in Brevard County from the State Route 528 junction in Cocoa to Palm Bay, as well as in northern Palm Beach County.

In 2009, state legislators representing Maine's Aroostook County proposed using federal economic stimulus funds to extend I-95 north to Maine's northernmost border community of Fort Kent via Caribou and Presque Isle. The proposed route would parallel New Brunswick's four-lane, limited-access Trans-Canada Highway on the US side of the Canada–US border. Legislators argued that extension of the Interstate would promote economic growth in the region.

Major intersections
Florida
 in Miami. The highways travel concurrently through the city.
 in Miami
 in Golden Glades
 in Golden Glades 
 in Fort Lauderdale
 in West Palm Beach
 in Melbourne
 in Daytona Beach
 in Daytona Beach
 in Jacksonville
 in Jacksonville
 in Jacksonville. I-95/US 17 travel concurrently through the city.
 in Jacksonville
Georgia
 in Brunswick
 near Midway
 in Savannah
 in Pooler
South Carolina
 near Port Royal
 in Yemassee
 in St. George
 near Bowman
 near Harleyville
 near Holly Hill
 near Santee. The highways travel concurrently to Santee.
 near Manning
 near Turbeville
 in Florence
 in Florence
 near Florence
North Carolina
 near Rowland
 near Rowland. The highways travel concurrently to Lumberton.
 near Lumberton
 in Eastover
 in Dunn
 in Benson
 in Selma
 in Wilson
 in Rocky Mount
 in Roanoke Rapids
Virginia
 in Emporia
 near Petersburg
 in Petersburg. I-95/US 460 travel concurrently through the city.
 in Richmond. The highways travel concurrently through Richmond.
 in Richmond
 in Richmond
 in Richmond 
 in Fredericksburg. The highways travel concurrently through Fredericksburg.
 in Springfield. The highways travel concurrently to College Park, Maryland.
District of Columbia
none
Maryland
 near Forest Heights
 near Glenarden
 near Adelphi
 near Baltimore
 near Baltimore
 near Baltimore
 in Baltimore
 in Baltimore
Delaware
 in Newport
Pennsylvania
 in Chester. The highways travel concurrently through Chester.
 in Ridley Township
 in Philadelphia
 in Philadelphia
 near Bristol
 near Bristol 
New Jersey
 in Florence Township
 in Mansfield Township
 in Bordentown Township
 in Robbinsville Township
 in Edison Township
 in Woodbridge Township
 in Elizabeth
 in Newark
 in Kearny
 in Secaucus / North Bergen
 in Ridgefield Park
 in Teaneck Township
 in Fort Lee. The highways travel concurrently to New York City.
New York
 in Manhattan
 in The Bronx
 in Throggs Neck
 in Rye
Connecticut
 in Norwalk
 in New Haven
 in East Lyme
Rhode Island
 in Warwick
 in Providence. The highways travel concurrently through the city.
 in Providence
 in Providence
Massachusetts
 in Attleboro
 in Mansfield
 in Canton. I-95/US 1 travel concurrently to Dedham.
/Mass Pike in Weston
 in Waltham
 in Burlington. The highways travel concurrently through the town.
 in Reading
 in Amesbury
New Hampshire
 in Portsmouth
Maine
 in Saco
 near Portland
 in Portland
 in Augusta
 in Fairfield
 in Bangor
 in Bangor 
 in Houlton
 in Houlton
 in Houlton

Auxiliary routes
I-95 has many auxiliary routes. They can be found in most states the route runs through, with exceptions being Georgia, South Carolina, and New Hampshire. Business routes also exist in both Georgia and North Carolina.

Florida
Interstate 195 is a spur into Miami, the northern of the two spurs into Miami (the other being I-395).
Interstate 295 is a beltway around Jacksonville.
Interstate 395 is a spur into Miami, the southern of the two spurs into Miami (the other being I-195).
Interstate 595 is a spur west of I-95 to I-75 and east of I-95 to Fort Lauderdale.
Interstate 795 is a future designation along State Route 9B.

North Carolina
Interstate 95 Business is a business loop in Fayetteville.
Interstate 295 is a partially completed beltway around Fayetteville.
Interstate 795 is a spur running to Goldsboro.

Virginia
 Interstate 195 is a short spur from north of downtown Richmond south into downtown.
 Interstate 295 is a bypass to the east of Richmond, from I-95 south of Petersburg, across I-64 east of Richmond and I-95 north of Richmond to I-64 west of Richmond.
 Interstate 395 is a branch from Springfield north into downtown Washington DC. It was part of I-95 until 1977.
 Interstate 495 is the Capital Beltway, a full loop around Washington DC. Since 1977, I-95 has run along its east half.

District of Columbia
 Interstate 295 is a branch from I-95 near the Woodrow Wilson Bridge through Anacostia and north to an interchange with I-695 and District of Columbia Route 295 (DC 295).
 Interstate 395 is a branch from Springfield north into downtown Washington DC, terminating at New York Avenue. It was part of I-95 until 1977.
 Interstate 695 is the Southeast Freeway, connecting I-395 and DC 295.

Maryland
Interstate 195 is a spur into Baltimore/Washington International Airport.
Interstate 295 is a southern route into Washington DC.
Interstate 395 is a spur into downtown Baltimore.
Interstate 495 is the Capital Beltway.
Interstate 595 is an unsigned segment of US 50 between the Capital Beltway and Annapolis.
Interstate 695 is the Baltimore Beltway.
Interstate 795 is a bypass of MD 140 in Reisterstown and Owings Mills.
Interstate 895 is the Harbor Tunnel Thruway.

Delaware, Pennsylvania, and New Jersey
Interstate 195 is a freeway through Central Jersey.
Interstate 295 is an eastern bypass of Philadelphia.
Interstate 495 is a bypass of Wilmington, Delaware.

New York
 Interstate 295 runs southeast from the Bruckner Interchange along the Cross Bronx Expressway, then south over the Throgs Neck Bridge and Clearview Expressway to its terminus at Hillside Avenue, just south of the Grand Central Parkway. It was once signed as part of I-78 and was planned to terminate at John F. Kennedy International Airport.
 Interstate 495 runs from the Queens–Midtown Tunnel east along the Long Island Expressway to Riverhead, crossing I-295 in Queens. It was once planned to continue west to I-95 in New Jersey; that part is now Lincoln Tunnel and Route 495. It was also to go east and meet I-95 again in either Connecticut or in Rhode Island. This would have made I-495 a bypass road for I-95.
 Interstate 695 is a short route along the Throgs Neck Expressway, connecting I-295 to I-95 in the Bronx. It was once signed as part of I-78. The number had been used for other plans, including a route parallel to Woodhaven Boulevard and an upgrade of the West Side Highway and Henry Hudson Parkway.

Connecticut, Rhode Island, and Massachusetts
Interstate 195 is a spur route east of Providence.
Interstate 295 is a partial outer beltway around Providence.
Interstate 395 runs from the junction with I-95 in Waterford north to the Massachusetts state line where it meets I-90/Massachusetts Turnpike and I-290 south of Worcester.
Interstate 495 is an outer beltway around Boston.

Maine
Interstate 195 is the Saco industrial spur. 
Interstate 295 connects with I-95 in Portland and Gardiner.
Interstate 395 is a spur to the east of Bangor.
Interstate 495 is the Falmouth spur.

See also

References

Further reading

External links

 
 I-95: The Road Most Traveled (special series). National Public Radio. 2010.

Interstate 95
95
95